The Socialist can refer to several socialist newspapers:

 The Socialist (UK newspaper), currently published by the Socialist Party (England and Wales)
 The Socialist (Irish newspaper), currently published by the Socialist Party (Ireland)
 The Socialist (Australian magazine), currently published by the Socialist Party (Australia)
 The Socialist (SLP newspaper), historically published by the Socialist Labour Party (UK, 1903)
 The Socialist (Seattle newspaper), published by Hermon F. Titus from 1900 to 1910
 The Socialist (US newspaper), currently published by the Socialist Party USA
 The Socialist (New York newspaper), historically published by the Socialist Education Society
 The Socialist (Australian newspaper), historically published by the Victorian Socialist Party
 The Socialist (Egyptian newspaper), currently published by the Revolutionary Socialists